Progressive Republican Party (Partido Republicano Progresista, PRP) was a Communist party in Venezuela led by Rodolfo Quintero. It was formed on 1 June 1936.

1936 establishments in Venezuela
Communist parties in Venezuela
Defunct communist parties
Defunct political parties in Venezuela
Political parties established in 1936